Ri'ayet al-Shabab Stadium is a multi-use stadium in the Syrian city of Aleppo. It was opened in 1965 and has a capacity of 10,000 spectators. It is mostly used for football matches and is currently the home ground of the Syrian Premier League club Al-Ittihad.

History
The stadium was opened in 1965 in the Sulaimaniyah district of Aleppo. It is owned and operated by the Aleppo directorate of the Ministry of Education.

The stadium is mostly used for football matches of the Syrian 3rd division. It also hosts local competitions of athletics.

During the Syrian Civil War, the stadium hosted all of the domestic matches of the football clubs in Aleppo who compete in the Syrian football league system, as it was the only stadium in the city not damaged during the war events, being located in a relatively secured neighborhood.

See also
List of football stadiums in Syria

References

Sports venues completed in 1965
1965 establishments in Syria
Football venues in Syria
Sports venues in Aleppo